The 1994–95 Northern Counties East Football League season was the 13th in the history of Northern Counties East Football League, a football competition in England.

Premier Division

The Premier Division featured 18 clubs which competed in the previous season, along with two new clubs, promoted from Division One:
Arnold Town
Hallam

League table

Division One

Division One featured 13 clubs which competed in the previous season, along with three new clubs.
Clubs relegated from the Premier Division:
Eccleshill United
Winterton Rangers
Plus:
Blidworth Welfare, joined from the Central Midlands League

Also, RES Parkgate changed name to Parkgate.

League table

External links
 Northern Counties East Football League

1994–95
8